The Lamar Lussi Athletic Complex, also called "the Lussi," is a multi-sport high school athletic complex in Lilburn, Georgia. It is the future home of the Providence Christian Academy Storm Football, Soccer, Softball, Track & Field, and Tennis teams. It is named for Providence Director of Encouragement Lamar Lussi, who has faithfully served the school for more than 25 years.

Project timeline
The complex was announced on November 30, 2012, at halftime, during the Storm Varsity Boys game against Our Lady of Mercy. It was also announced that the complex would be named for Lamar Lussi.
Ground was broken on May 18, 2015 and work began on drainage, retention, and leveling.
In August, September, and October, retention walls were built and concrete was poured for the track and field.
In November and December, the Fieldturf multi-purpose field was installed along with the pouring of asphalt for the tennis courts and the construction of the dugouts and net posts for the softball field.

Project components
The Complex includes:
A state of the art Fieldturf multi-purpose field for use by Soccer and Football
An eight-lane track surrounding the field with pits for field events
A full-size Softball field with dugouts and nets
6 Tennis Courts
Additional parking for athletic events

References

Buildings and structures in Gwinnett County, Georgia
Sports venues completed in 2016